Christian Henking (born 14 January 1961) is a Swiss composer, conductor and choir leader.

Life 
Henking was born in Basel in 1961. From 1981 to 1989 he studied music theory with Theo Hirsbrunner at the University of the Arts Bern. In addition he was trained by Ewald Körner to become Kapellmeister. From 1987 he took composition lessons with Cristóbal Halffter, Dimitri Terzakis and Edisson Denissow. He also attended master classes with Wolfgang Rihm and Heinz Holliger. He received further impulses from György Kurtág.

He is also a lecturer in musical composition and music theory at the University of the Arts Bern. Henking was one of the founding members of the Groupe Lacroix. The majority of his compositions are published by Müller & Schade in Bern.

Awards 
 2000: Culture Prize of the Bürgi-Willert Foundation, Bern. (bestowed by Heinz Holliger)
 2002: Recognition Prize for Music of the Canton of Bern.
 2016: Music Prize of the Canton of Bern.

Work

Orchestral music 
 Brest (1990) for 2 violoncellos and string orchestra
 piece for 19 cellos (1991)
 Wie Tau, im Lichte siebenfach gebrochen (1995) for 12 flutes
 Paragraph (1998) for orchestra
 Concert (2003) for violin and string orchestra
 Piazza / Spazio (2004) for orchestra

Chamber music 
 *** (1984) for piano solo
 9 Fragmente (1985) for viola and piano
 Klavierstück (1988)
 Créaction (1988) for flute, clarinet, bassoon (also co-fage), piano, violin, violoncello and percussion
 piano quartet (1989)
 Small piece for violin and accordion (1991)
 4 Bagatelles (1992) for clarinet trio
 Sillis (1992) for guitar solo
 Prosím (1992) for violin and bass clarinet
 Lirpa (1993) for piano solo
 5 Bagatelles (1993) for piano solo
 Please rise (1994) for piano trio
 Concerto for bass trombone and brass band (1994)
 Kalymnos (1994) for tenor saxophone and accordion
 Metavirulent (1995) for violin and piano
 Quartet (1995) for flute, viola, violoncello and piano
 Je voudrais faire votre portrait (1995) for piano quartet
 Joëlle (1996) for flute and organ
 Merle blanc (1996) for string octet
 Viento (1996) for flute solo
 Song for M.A.K. (1996) for 4 bamboo flutes and 4 glasses
 7 Bagatelles (1996) for piano solo
 Novalis 24 (1996) for piano trio
 Stück (Piece) for 5 violas, or 5 cellos (1989–1997)
 Dublin (1997) for percussion
 6 Bagatelles (1997) for piano solo
 Six pieces for Edison (1997) for violin and violoncello
 Buyuma Place (1997) for string quartet
 Die Geschichte vom Pelikan und Pavian (1997) for violin and piano
 Karimata (1998) for string quartet
 Colline des forêts argentines (1998) for violin, violoncello and piano four hands
 Insigne (1998) for violoncello solo
 Toro (1998) for violoncello and piano
 Yemanjá (1999) for one percussionist
 3 Bagatelles for 3 English horns (1999)
 Deruda (1999) for clarinet, violin and piano
 Reservoir (2000) for clarinet and piano
 Ode to Mr Muheim (2000) for 2 flutes
 Lotus (2002) for flute solo
 Amplitudes (2002) for violin solo
 Assedo (2003) for flute and piano
 To my lips come the scents to the potions (2005) for 4 percussions
 Chi (2005) for shakuhachi and violin
 "Dört unte-n-i der Tiefi" (2007) for flute and violoncello
 Scènes d'enfants (2007) for piano solo
 "Und blaue Funken brennen" (2007) for piano trio
 Diapason (2008) for violin solo
 Helian (2009) for double bass solo
 Turn around (2009) for 2 pianos
 Intermission (2010) for 2 pianos
 In weit Ferne (2011) for violin, violoncello and piano
 Four Moments (2014) for guitar and violoncello. Composed for the Duo En Cuerdas.

Stage music 
 Stück für Klarinette und Pantomime (1988)
 Leonce und Lena (1999–2001). Opera in 3 acts. Libretto by Christian Henking after Georg Büchner
 Bon appétit (2005). A musical theatre for 4 people
 "Dash" (2007). Small scene for soprano and clarinet

Choral music 
 Cotton Gloves (1995) for six-part choir. text: W. H. Auden
 und sehe dich tanzen Gebete des Friedens (1996). Cantata for soprano, alto, four-part choir, percussion and string quintet
 Schatten (1997) for 4-part choir, 2 violins, 2 cellos and double bass. text: Wolfgang Musculus
 Palindrome and Nonsense (1997) for soprano, alto, four-part choir, male narrative (from choir) and 2 pianos. text: Christian Henking
 Dromedar (1998) for four-part choir. text: Christian Henking
 Ich bin so müde von Seufzen (2001) for 8-part mixed choir
 Requiem (2001) for choir, 2 flutes, percussion and strings
 Fragment (2003) for baritone, four-part choir, organ and double bass

Vocal music 
 Ottos Mops (1989) für 9 Stimmen. Text Ernst Jandl
 Zitate (1990) für 7 Stimmen (frei wählbar) und Orchester. Text Alltags-, Werbe- und Mediensprache
 Slogans (1991) für Sopran, Flöte, Oboe, Horn und Kontrabass. Text Werbesprache
 Zig (1992) für Sopran und Vibraphon
 Schattige Gärten / Von Blutbuchenblättern (1990–1993) für Bariton und Klavier. Text Friederike Roth
 und ich stolpere mich näher zu Dir (1996). Liederzyklus für Mezzosopran und Klavier. Text Bettina Kaelin
 Die Geschichte vom Pelikan und Pavian (1996) für Violine, Klavier und Sprecher
 Nero (1997) für Sopran und Streichtrio. Text Franz Schubert
 Sahara (1997) für singende Pianistin oder singenden Pianisten oder klavierspielende Sängerin oder klavierspielenden Sänger
 Leb wohl, du schöner Zedernwald (1997) für Alt, Flöte, Klarinette, Klavier, Violine und Violoncello. Text Adolf Wölfli
 „Unbescholtenheit und Ordnung“ (1999) für Mezzosopran, 2 Tenöre, Bariton, Bassbariton und Klavier. Text William Shakespeare
 TIK (1999) für Sopran, Mezzosopran, Flöte, Oboe, Klarinette, Streichquartett und Klavier. Text Daniil Charms, Dan Wiener
 Hommage à -tt- (2001) für Sopran, Klarinette, Violoncello und Klavier. Text: Martin Etter
 Die Liebe des Dichters (2002). Lied für Bariton und Klavier. Text Robert Schumann
 Maifeuer (2003) für Sopran, Flöte und Klavier. Text Rose Ausländer
 „Zeit zwischen meinen Rippen“ (2003). Ein kleiner Liederzyklus für Alt/Mezzosopran und Klavier. Text Astrid Scholtz
 Was ist es also? (2005) für (Mezzo)Sopran und Klavier. Text Erich Fried
 Ein Vogelort schwarz (2006) für Bariton und Klavier. Text Nora Schmidt
 Weil auf mir (2006) für Bariton und Klavier. Text Nikolaus Lenau
 Empreinte (2008) für Trio Basso und Sprecherin. Text Joël-Claude Meffre
 La voix, au loin (2008) für Trio Basso und Sprecherin. Text Joël-Claude Meffre
 In eines Spiegels Bläue (2009) für Mezzosopran und Klavier. Text Georg Trakl
 ein reigen (2011). Liederzyklus für Tenor und Klavier. Text Raphael Urweider
 Keine Zeit ist zeitig mit der Sehnsucht Zeit (2011) für Mezzosopran, Bariton, Flöte, Lupophon, Kontraforte, Violine, Violoncello, Harfe und Klavier. Text Robert Walser

Discography 
 Werkauswahl 1993–1997. U.a. Amadeus Chor Bern (M&S Music, 1997)
 Moscow Rachmaninov Trio: Novalis 24 für Klaviertrio. In Groupe Lacroix: The Composer Group (Creative Works Records, 1997)
 Thomas Blumenthal (Ensemble Sortisatio): Sillis für Gitarre solo. In Groupe Lacroix: 8 Pieces on Paul Klee (Creative Works Records, 2003)
 Esther Flückiger: 5 Bagatellen für Klavier. In Festival L'art pour L'Aar. Die Konzerte 2006/2007 (Pentaphon, 2007)
 Capella Nova: Ich bin ein schwebendes Luftblatt für 16-stimmigen Chor und Harfe. In BAP NOS (Guild, 2010)
 Ensemble Proton Bern: Keine Zeit ist zeitig mit der Sehnsucht Zeit” für Mezzosopran, Bariton, Flöte, Lupophon, Kontraforte, Violine, Violoncello, Harfe und Klavier. In Grammont Selection 5 (Musiques Suisses 2012)

Literature 
 Christian Henking. In Hans Steinbeck, Walter Labhart (Hrsg.): Schweizer Komponisten unserer Zeit. Biographien, Werkverzeichnisse mit Discographie und Bibliographie. Amadeus, Winterthur 1993, .
 Theo Hirsbrunner: Tendenziell, nicht starr – der Komponist Christian Henking. In Dissonanz 55 (1998), .
 Henking, Christian. In Peter Hollfelder: Klaviermusik. Internationales chronologisches Lexikon. Geschichte. Komponisten. Werke. Supplement, Noetzel, Wilhelmshaven 2005, .
 Henking, Christian. In Axel Schniederjürgen (ed.): Kürschners Musiker-Handbuch. 5. Auflage, Saur Verlag, Munich 2006, .

References

External links 
 Website von Christian Henking
 
 
 Christian Henking in der MusicSack-Datenbank
 Biographie, Werkliste, Diskographie und Bibliographie von Christian Henking in der Online-Datenbank musinfo.ch der Schweizer Musikedition
 Sound recordings with works of the composer from the archive of SRG SSR on Neo.Mx3
 

20th-century classical composers
Swiss opera composers
Choral conductors
1961 births
Living people
Musicians from Basel-Stadt
20th-century Swiss composers